James E. Peele (June 12, 1907 – October 17, 1976) was an American football player, coach of football and baseball, and college athletics administrator.  He served as the head football coach at the University at Buffalo from 1936 to 1947, compiling a record of 38–34–1. Peele was also the head baseball coach at Buffalo in 1949 and from 1952 to 1967, tallying a mark of 177–66.  A native of Staunton, Illinois, Peele played college football as a quarterback at Purdue University.  He came to Buffalo 1934 as an assistant football coach under George Van Bibber and succeeded him as head football coach and athletic director in 1936.  Peele remained athletic director until 1969.  He died on October 17, 1976, in Buffalo, New York.

Head coaching record

References

1907 births
1976 deaths
American football quarterbacks
Buffalo Bulls athletic directors
Buffalo Bulls baseball coaches
Buffalo Bulls football coaches
Purdue Boilermakers football players
People from Staunton, Illinois